Monastery of Holy Mother of God may refer to:

 Monastery of Holy Mother of God, Kuršumlija, a defunct Serbian Orthodox monastery located in Kuršumlija
 Monastery of the Holy Mother of God, Ston, a Serbian Orthodox monastery located in Ston

See also 

 Holy Mother of God Cathedral (disambiguation)
 Holy Mother of God Church (disambiguation)